Adikanda Mahanta (born 8 May 1954, Chitrada - 13 January 2015) was an Indian folklorist from Chitrada, Odisha. He is one of the pioneer folklorists of Odisha and is well known for his research on folk culture of eastern India.

Biography
Mahanta was born in Chitrada, Mayurbhanj, Orissa, India to Shri Shiva Prasad and Satyabhama Mohanta. He stood First Class Honours in the Oriya Masters program at Ranchi University. He then earned his PhD in the folk culture of Orissa. He successfully defended his thesis "Odishara Kurmali Lokagita" (Kurmali Folk Songs of Orissa) in 1988 at the same university.

Mohanta was a Sub-Inspector of Schools for the Government of Orissa and worked with Basanta Kishore Sahoo and founder Manindra Mohanty for the organisation Research Institute for Oriya Children's Literature. Mahanta has two 2008 textbooks that were added to state curricula by the Government of Orissa in the 2009-2010 academic year: Odisha ra srasta adibasi loka katha, Part 1 and Itihasaru sikshiba aasa. In Orissa, Mahanta was known for his contributions towards children's literature. Additionally, he served as editor-in-chief for the folklore journals Pharua (1998-2002), Kudmi Katha (1995-2008), and  Bandana.

Awards and honours
 1985: Bisubamilana Sisu Sahittika Sammana - Prajatantra Prachar Samiti
 1986: Kanakadurga Motimahal Gadaradanga Puri Award
 1987: Kendujhar Jillastariya Sisu Sahitya Sansad Award
 1987: Sisu Sahittika Award - Kuwantara Bhubaneswar
 1988: Rasachhanda Kendujhar Award
 1998: Sri Sri Jagannath Tatwasrom Udaybatu Jagatsingpur Award
 1998: Agami Satabdi Bhubaneswar Jhumar Gabesaka Award
 1999: Mayurbhanj Banipitha Haldipada Award
 2000: Mayurbhanj Jilastariya Sebaka Samiti Award
 2001: Saraswata Baniputra Award
 2001: Purulia Paschimbanga Lokasahitya Award 
 2005: Rajyastrariya Kruti Sikhaka Award
 2008: Rajat Jayanti Prabandhika Award - Mayurbhanj Sahitya Parishad
 2010: Kalingaratna Samman Award

Selected publications
 1985: Uttar Odishara Loka katha
 1988: Gapa suniba aasa
 1991: Satirtha galpa
 1993: Gyana tapaswi radhakrusnan
 1997: Odisha ra srestha adivasi loka katha
 1998: Tiring ringa
 1999: Kudmi loka katha
 2002: Karam katha
 2003: "Folk Treatment System of Tribal Society in Eastern India" (pages 62-65) in Changing Tribal Life: A Socio-philosophical Perspective by Padmaja Sen 
 2005: Kudmi janma sanskara
 2006: Kurmali loka katha o laka gita: Samanya kathana
 2006: Jhumar samikhya
 2006: Chheng gargar khapra pitha
 2007: Kudmi biplabi neta
 2007: Chau Nrutya samanya kathana
 2007: Mayurbhanja ra lokabadya
 2007: Kudmi jati eka bihangabalokana
 2007: "Ecological Ideologies in Tribal Folklore of Eastern India" (pages 71-77) in Forest, Government, and Tribe by Chittaranjan Kumar Paty 
 2008: Utara Odisha ra loka nrutya

References

Indian folklorists
Living people
1954 births
People from Mayurbhanj district
Indian children's writers